Pavel Bogush (born 24 January 1996) is a Belarusian professional footballer who plays for Uzda.

References

External links 
 
 
 Profile at BATE website

1996 births
Living people
Belarusian footballers
Association football midfielders
FC BATE Borisov players
FC Smolevichi players
FC Luch Minsk (2012) players
FC Krumkachy Minsk players
FC Granit Mikashevichi players
FC Chist players
FC Uzda players